This is a list of notable microbursts.

List 
 July 13, 1890 – A microburst capsized the vessel Sea Wing on Lake Pepin between Wisconsin and Minnesota, killing 98 people.
 A particularly violent microburst is a possible alternative explanation to the 1961 sinking of the American school brigantine Albatross. The ship's captain Dr. Christopher Sheldon claimed that the ship was hit by a white squall on the voyage from Progreso, Yucatán, to Nassau in the Bahamas.
 1980–1995 – FAA-supported investigations into microburst morphology and microburst detection and warning systems. Principals: Ted Fujita, U. Chicago, John McCarthy and James Wilson, NCAR, J. Evans and Marilyn M. Wolfson, MIT Lincoln Laboratory, R Bowles and F Proctor, NASA). Hundreds of microbursts were detected and studied, many by dual Doppler weather radar analysis.
 August 1, 1983 – The strongest microburst recorded at an airport was observed at Andrews Air Force Base, Maryland, near Washington, DC. The wind speeds may have exceeded  in this microburst. The peak gust was recorded at 2:11 PM –-7 minutes after Air Force One, with the President on board, landed on the same runway.
 August 2, 1985 - Delta Flight 191 encountered a microburst while attempting to land at Dallas-Fort Worth Airport and subsequently crashed, killing 136 passengers and crew on board the aircraft and one person on the ground.
The ship took the lives of her captain and three of her other 11 crew members.
 May 13, 1989—A microburst damaged around 200 helicopters and other aircraft at Fort Hood, Texas, at an estimated cost of $600 million dollars, despite the aircraft being secured for storm weather.
 July 8, 1989 – Denver Stapleton International Airport. After being alerted by LLWAS of an imminent encounter with a  microburst, Captain Craig Levine initiated a missed approach, taking his Boeing 737 to full takeoff power, climbing  and adding  of airspeed. Encountering the microburst at full takeoff power, they lost  of altitude and lost  of airspeed in about one-half of a minute. This event is a documented "save" of an airplane by a windshear alert system.
 August 7, 1994 – Severe thunderstorms produce numerous reports of damaging winds (and large hail) across central, southern, and southeastern Oklahoma. The worst damage occurs in Prague, where estimated winds of  produced widespread damage across town, downed the steeple of a church, partially unroofed the high school, and damaged to destroyed mobile homes.
 August 17, 1994 – A series of extreme downbursts are produced by a southward moving long-lived supercell thunderstorm across south-central Kansas and western Oklahoma, whereafter new severe storms fire in western Oklahoma and drop into north Texas. At least two tornadoes and windblown hail the size of softballs and footballs also occur.
 July 15, 1995 – A series of microbursts hit northern and eastern New York State, killing 5 people, injuring 11, and causing nearly a half billion dollars in damages. It was the second derecho of a series during mid-July. The storms severely damaged  of forest in the Adirondack Park, necessitating the helicopter rescue of 31 hikers/backpackers stranded in the backcountry due to blocked trails.
Brockton, Whitman, and Abington were the hardest hit towns.
 On August 14, 1996 a severe thunderstorm and its accompanying dry microburst hit the northwest portion of the Phoenix metropolitan area, ripping off tile roofs and causing $160 million in damage. A few locations had to go without power for several days.
 In the early hours of September 7, 1998, a microburst hit the city of Syracuse, New York. Three people were killed and the area suffered $130 million in damages.
On July 12, 2002, a microburst hit the town of Quincy, CA, snapping trees and damaging homes in a random pattern.
 On March 12, 2006, at approximately 8:10 AM, a severe microburst with winds varying from  damaged large portions of Lawrence, Kansas. Reported damage included downed power lines, stop lights and trees, overturned semi-trailers, collapsed farm silos and damage to roofs. Seventy buildings on the University of Kansas campus reported damage. In total, over $8 million in damages was estimated.
 On May 6, 2008, a microburst made by a LP/HP supercell hit Olton, Texas. It did no damage.
 On November 16, 2008, a microburst during a severe supercell thunderstorm unleashed major havoc on the suburb of The Gap in Brisbane, Queensland, Australia.
 On February 12, 2009, high winds from a microburst caused a  wind gust in West Mifflin, Pennsylvania. Several damages were reported including roofs and garages collapsing.
 On May 2, 2009, a microburst struck the Dallas Cowboys indoor practice facility in Irving, Texas, causing the roof to collapse. 12 people were hospitalized.
 On July 11, 2009, winds believed to be caused by a microburst uprooted trees and brought down close to 30 utility poles in Mississauga, Ontario.
 On July 21, 2009, a strong thunderstorm produced a probable microburst in the western and southern suburbs of Denver, Colorado, causing extensive damage to trees and property. Cities that were most affected were Lakewood, Wheat Ridge, and Arvada.
 In the evening of August 18, 2009, an isolated thunderstorm originated in Bridgewater when a boundary generated from rain-cooled air associated with the isolated thunderstorm quickly shifted east toward Newark, New Jersey. Shortly thereafter, the isolated thunderstorm quickly intensified strong-to-severe while in the vicinity of Newark and after the intensification, the isolated severe thunderstorm produced  hail in Hoboken and Weehawken. The isolated severe thunderstorm changed direction from moving east to northeast as the thunderstorm approached and shortly affected Manhattan, New York City. The isolated severe thunderstorm was responsible for producing  thunderstorm wind gust, resulted a possible microburst that downed over few more than 500 trees, damaged several automobiles and spread debris across some streets.
All 64 people who were on board (48 students attending school on board, eight teachers and eight crew) were rescued from 5 life rafts by merchant vessels.
 In the afternoon of June 24, 2010, there were reports of  thunderstorm winds that downed tree limbs with some roads temporarily blocked by fallen tree limbs as the linear cluster of severe thunderstorms impacted across northern New Jersey and southeastern New York. Nutley, Cliffside Park, and Pompton are locations that reported downed tree limbs.  thunderstorm wind was reported in SUNY Maritime College that knocked down trees and tree limbs when the linear clusters quickly changed into a severe thunderstorm after leaving The Bronx and central portions of Manhattan counties.  thunderstorm gust was reported twice in LaGuardia Airport and fallen trees destroyed two homes and one car in College Point.  thunderstorm wind was reported in Whitestone, responsible for downed numerous utility poles, street lamps, trees, at least one collapsed chimney, and damaged several vehicles, including a destroyed mini-van. Besides from thunderstorm wind damage, a funnel cloud was reported over Flushing Bay and the severe thunderstorm dumped at least golf ball sized hail in Queens side of Throgs Neck Bridge that was reported earlier with at least one car dented. After the aftermath of northeastern Queens, the severe thunderstorm produced  thunderstorm gust in Kings Point and  thunderstorm wind that was reported near Great Neck, resulted a microburst that accompanied dime-to-quarter sized hail and downed numerous large trees, powerlines and uprooted trees. The microburst produced winds exceeding  that caused significant damage to homes and automobiles across Long Island.
 In the afternoon of June 24, 2010, a severe thunderstorm resembling characteristics of a supercell produced a wet microburst exceed  winds and severe hail in the townships of Drexel Hill, Springfield, and Broomall, Pennsylvania in Delaware County, uprooted trees and damaged homes.
 On August 25, 2010, a microburst storm squall hit in the Lake Elsinore, California had snapped power poles.
 On September 1, 2010, a microburst was reported in West Yellowstone, Montana.
 On September 16, 2010, a macroburst was reported in the Middle Village and Forest Hills areas of Queens, New York during an unexpected linear/bowing segments contained intense thunderstorms that spawned two weak tornadoes. In a city with a population of 9 million people, only one fatality was reported. A tree fell on a Pennsylvania couple's vehicle and killed the wife.
No fatalities were reported.
 On May 27, 2011, in the Morgantown, West Virginia neighborhood of Westover, a wet microburst hit with winds in the  range. The National Weather Service, reported that "numerous trees came down in the Westover area. A metal roof from a car dealership was blown off in downtown Morgantown...while trees were uprooted on the campus of West Virginia University, including a 122-year-old silver maple which was the fifth oldest tree on the campus. The strong winds knocked down or uprooted trees sporadically eastward until the storm reached the Pleasant Hill Cemetery."
An inch (2.54 cm) of rain fell within 20 minutes, causing areas of flash flooding. The storm caused widespread damage to both residences and businesses across the town. Electrical poles were snapped causing power outages to 33,000 residents.
 On July 31, 2011, a microburst hit in the Victorville, California thousands were customers had lost power.
 On July 18, 2012, a microburst hit in Arlington, Massachusetts. Gusts were 70 to 80 mph, with worst damage in about a square mile area. Many trees and utility poles were damaged, tearing power lines from homes. There was one report of a fish blown five blocks from a pond that was near the center of the storm.
On July 20, 2012 a microburst hit Ferry County, Washington with winds of up to 100 mph. Two people were killed in the storm, and it cost over $2 million dollars in electrical damage, blowing down over 900 miles of power lines. Over 3,000 forested acres were destroyed from the associated remnants of Hurricane Fabio.
 On August 30, 2012, a severe microburst hit in Moreno Valley, California, and winds gust to 90 mph squall line in Apple Valley, California.
 On July 19, 2013, a microburst hit in Las Vegas, Nevada causing severely knocked out trees and power lines. Wind gusts have been reported to reach 70-80 mph.
 On July 3, 2014, in the town of Cherryville, North Carolina a wet microburst tore apart a portion of a gas station car wash and brought down powerlines and trees. One tree fell on top of a mobile home nearly cutting it in half. The resident was injured when the fallen tree pinned him to the floor.
 On July 7, 2014, a microburst hit Tomball, Texas causing severe localized damage and power outages, including fallen-trees.
 On July 26, 2014, a wet microburst hit northern parts of Phoenix, Arizona felling trees, damaging homes, and causing power outages.
 On August 7, 2014 an apparent microburst toppled dozens of boats in the Dillon Reservoir in Dillon, Colorado, leaving emergency workers scrambling to get boaters out of the cold water.
 On Dec 20, 2014, an episode of severe thunderstorms produced damaging winds and hailstorms in Southern Brazil. A severe thunderstorm in Porto Alegre brought destructive wind gusts up to (80 mph; 129 km/h) causing significant damage. Another severe thunderstorm brought a severe wet microburst that hit Santana do Livramento, Rio Grande do Sul. More than 400 homes were damaged, some of them were completely destroyed, trees were downed and power lines destroyed. In addition, eight wind turbines were destroyed by gusts up to 250 km/h.
 On June 23, 2015, a microburst hit Gloucester County and Camden County, New Jersey, causing major power outages across the region. Many homes and roads were damaged by fallen trees and debris from the storm.
 On July 29, 2015, a microburst hit in the Phelan, California had knocked out power.
 On May 4, 2017, a microburst hit in Lacey, Washington had uprooted trees and fallen power lines.
 On Sept 3, 2017, a microburst hit in Santa Barbara, California and knocked off numerous trees and many landed on cars with many power lines down. Multiple traffic accidents occurred and 56 people were tossed into the water. A 22-foot sailboat was also overturned and was sinking into the ocean. With the associated from Tropical Storm Lidia.
 On February 2, 2019 a microburst hit in Long Beach, California with winds gusting 50 mph as a winter storm, and several trees fell.
Occurring at an elevation of  amsl around 18:45 local time, the 30-45 min duration winds flattened many and severely damaged numerous buildings, leading to 28 deaths and hundreds of injuries.
On June 1, 2019, a relatively short-lived MCS with embedded stronger microbursts formed after morning storms on the west side of Michigan intensified and supercells formed west of Detroit. An area on the west side of Novi and another northwest of West Bloomfield (near Green Lake) were hit especially hard. Wind gusts of 70-80 MPH were estimated in few corridors causing numerous branches, and in some cases, whole trees, to snap. Thousands lost power.
 On June 10, 2019, a microburst with wind speeds of up to 70 mph hit the DFW metroplex, leaving approximately 220,000 people without electricity in Dallas County, damaging many skyscrapers and other buildings, and knocking down around 200 trees. 
 On July 6, 2019, a microburst hit Longmeadow, Massachusetts, downing dozens of trees, damaging cars, and houses.
 On August 20, 2019, a microburst hit in the Sevierville, Tennessee area, toppling trees and causing power outages to parts of nearby Pigeon Forge, Tennessee.
 On July 10, 2020, a microburst hit in Eastern Germany.
 On June 3, 2022, a microburst caused extensive crop damage in Wenona, North Carolina.

See also 
 List of deadliest Storm Prediction Center days by outlook risk level
 List of derecho events
 List of tornadoes and tornado outbreaks

References

Severe weather and convection
 
Weather hazards
Weather-related lists